The 2010 Golden Spin of Zagreb was the 43rd edition of an annual senior-level figure skating competition held in Zagreb, Croatia. It was held at the Dom Sportova between December 9 and 11, 2010 as part of the 2010–11 season. Skaters competed in the disciplines of men's singles, ladies' singles, pair skating, and ice dancing.

Schedule

Results

Men

Ladies

 WD = Withdrawn

Pairs

Ice dancing

External links
 2010 Golden Spin of Zagreb results
 2010 Golden Spin of Zagreb
 https://web.archive.org/web/20110721100407/http://www.croskate.hr/media/ZP10-Announcement.doc

Golden Spin Of Zagreb, 2010
Golden Spin Of Zagreb, 2010
2010s in Zagreb